Blanchard Ridge is a rocky ridge,  high, at the north side of the mouth of Wiggins Glacier on Kyiv Peninsula on the west coast of Graham Land. It was mapped by the French Antarctic Expedition, 1908–10, and named by Jean-Baptiste Charcot for a Monsieur Blanchard, then French Consul at Punta Arenas.

References
 SCAR Composite Gazetteer of Antarctica.
 

Ridges of Graham Land
Graham Coast